The Australian Football League celebrates the best mark of the season through the annual Mark of the Year competition. In 2017, this is officially known as the Woolworths AFL Mark of the Year. Each round three marks are nominated and fans are able to vote online for their favourite. Following the shock win, Collingwood's president Eddie McGuire said that the voting system for Mark of the Year needs an overhaul.

Winners by round
Legend

Finalists

References

External links

Goal of the Year
Australian rules football-related lists